Pigskin may refer to:

 Ball (gridiron football) (also a pigskin), a ball, roughly in the form of a prolate spheroid, used in the context of playing gridiron football
 Pigskin (video game), a 1979 video game by Acorn Software Products for the TRS-80
 Pigskin 621 A.D., an arcade game released in 1990 by Midway Manufacturing
 "Pigskin", the sixth song from the 2013 Hollywood Undead album Notes from the Underground